William Thoburn may refer to:

William Thoburn (politician), Canadian woollen manufacturer and politician in the province of Ontario
William Thoburn (rower), Canadian Olympic rower